Line A is a line on the Lyon Metro that runs between Perrache and Vaulx-en-Velin La Soie. It was constructed using the cut-and-cover method, and went into service on 2 May 1978. It, together with Line B, were the inaugural lines of the Lyon Metro. An extension of Line A from Laurent Bonnevay, Astroballe to Vaulx-en-Velin, La Soie opened in 2007. Line A trains run on tires rather than steel wheels; it is a rubber-tired metro line.

List of the stations
 Perrache
 Ampère - Victor Hugo
 Bellecour
 Cordeliers
 Hôtel de Ville - Louis Pradel
 Foch
 Masséna
 Charpennes - Charles Hernu
 République - Villeurbanne
 Gratte-Ciel
 Flachet - Alain Gilles
 Cusset
 Laurent Bonnevay
 Vaulx-en-Velin La Soie

Chronology
 2 May 1978: Perrache - Laurent Bonnevay
 2 October 2007: Laurent Bonnevay - Vaulx-en-Velin La Soie

Extension
Line A was extended  eastwards from Laurent Bonnevay to Vaulx-en-Velin La Soie (1 station) to provide connection with the new express tram line to St Exupéry Airport, called Rhônexpress as well as Tram 3. This extension opened on 2 October 2007 and cost €53 million.

Notes

External links
Transports en Commun Lyonnais (TCL)
Extension to Vaulx-en-Velin La Soie

1st arrondissement of Lyon
2nd arrondissement of Lyon
6th arrondissement of Lyon
Rubber-tyred metros
Railway lines opened in 1978
A